Best Off is a French aircraft manufacturer founded in Toulouse by Philippe Prevot to market his Sky Ranger ultralight.

Aircraft
Best Off Nynja
Best Off Sky Ranger

References

External links
*
Aircraft manufacturers of France
Manufacturing companies based in Toulouse